David Attenborough: A Life on Our Planet is a 2020 British documentary film narrated by David Attenborough and produced and directed by Jonnie Hughes. The film acts as a "witness statement", through which Attenborough shares first-hand his concern for the current state of the planet due to humanity's impact on nature and his hopes for the future. It was released on Netflix on 4 October 2020, along with a companion book A Life on Our Planet.

Synopsis 
From Pripyat, a deserted area after the nuclear disaster, Attenborough gives an overview of his life. Interspersed with footage of his career and of a wide variety of ecosystems, he narrates key moments in his career and indicators of how the planet has changed since he was born in 1926. As a child, Attenborough enjoyed studying fossils. His documentary career began in the 1950s when he began working for the BBC, a British public service broadcaster. He visited places such as the African Serengeti, in which native animals require vast areas of land to maintain grazing patterns. Over time, he noticed a decline in wildlife when searching for fish or orangutans in Borneo or other animals which he was looking for as part of his documentaries. Areas of the Arctic or Antarctic were different to what the filming crew expected due to ice caps melting. The causes are anthropogenic climate change and biodiversity loss pushing the planet towards a sixth mass extinction event over a period of centuries rather than the hundreds of millennia that built up to previous mass extinctions.

Attenborough describes the film as his "witness statement" and gives an impression of what could happen to the planet over the course of a lifetime beginning in 2020 and lasting as long as his own, were human activity to continue unchanged. The Amazon rainforest could degrade into a savanna; the Arctic could lose all ice during summer; coral reefs could die; soil overuse could cause food crises. These irreversible events would cause mass extinction and exacerbate climate change further.

However, Attenborough describes actions which could prevent these effects and combat climate change and biodiversity loss. He asserts that the solution has been "staring us in the face all along. To restore stability to our planet, we must restore its biodiversity. The very thing that we've removed." He proposes re-wilding; moreover, he says that bringing countries out of poverty, providing universal healthcare and improving girls' education would make the growing human population stabilise sooner and at a lower level. Renewable energy such as solar, wind, water and geothermal could sustainably power all human energy usage. Protecting a third of coastal areas from fishing could allow fish populations to thrive and the remaining area would be sufficient for human consumption. Humans changing their diet to eliminate or reduce meat in favour of plant-based foods could allow land to be used far more efficiently. Attenborough cites government intervention in Costa Rica causing deforestation to reverse, Palau's fishing regulations and improved use of land in the Netherlands as good examples.

Production 
Initially scheduled for cinematic release on 16 April 2020, the film was delayed due to the COVID-19 pandemic. The film premiered on 28 September 2020 in cinemas and debuted on the online streaming platform Netflix on 4 October. The day prior, a promotional video was released showing Attenborough answer questions from celebrities.

A companion book, A Life on Our Planet: My Witness Statement and a Vision for the Future, was released in October 2020.

Reception 
The film received positive critical reception. Patrick Cremona of Radio Times gave it five out of five stars, finding it "quite unlike" Attenborough's previous works and lauding its "blending" of a "terrifying condemnation" of humans' treatment of the natural world, and a "hopeful and inspirational manifesto" of how to address the climate crisis. Rating it four out of five stars, Ed Potton of The Times approved of the depiction of animals and Attenborough's "intimacy" and "authority" in his narration, but suggested that more of Attenborough's personal life could have been shown. Emma Clarke of the Evening Standard called the film "an essential watch". Natalia Winkelman of The New York Times praised the "astonishing nature photography" and juxtaposition between thriving and dying ecosystems.

Accolades 
In 2021, the film was nominated for five Emmy Awards.

References

External links 
 Official website
 
 

British television documentaries
David Attenborough
Documentary films about nature
English-language television shows
2020 documentary films
2020 films
2020 television films
Films scored by Steven Price
2020s British films